Michael Whitaker (born 17 March 1960) is a British Olympic equestrian rider, who competes in the sport of show jumping. He was ranked 5th by the British Showjumping Association in March 2014.

Career 
Younger brother of John Whitaker, Michael began competing on ponies at the age of 5. At the age of 16, he made his debut in international competitions and in 1980 he became the second youngest winner of the Hickstead Derby, at the age of 20. In September 1993 he took over from his brother John as the internationally top-ranked show jumping rider.

In 2009 Whitaker was banned from competition for four months after his stallion Tackeray tested positive for a synthetic hormone altrenogest during a competition in France. Altrenogest is a female hormone that Whitaker claimed was present in the sample due to a mix up in feed buckets. Whitaker was found to be negligent for the positive test.

Personal life

Born and raised on his parents' farm in Yorkshire. Michael and his three brothers John, Steven and Ian were taught to ride by their mother Enid, a keen horsewoman. Michael began riding aged three on a Shetland pony named Hercules.

In December 1980, Michael married Belgian show jumper Veronique. They separated in 1997, and later divorced.

Michael and Melissa married on 13 August 2013 in a registry office in Nottinghamshire. They live at Whatton, Nottinghamshire with their children Jack, Molly and Katy.

Major achievements 
1984: Olympic Games, Los Angeles. Team Silver medal with Overton Amanda
1985: European Championships, Dinard. Team Gold medal with Warren Point
1986: World Championships, Aachen. Team Silver medal with Warren Point
1987: European Championships, St. Gallen. Team Gold Medal with Overton Amanda
1989: European Championships, Rotterdam. Team Gold Medal and individual silver medal with Mon Santa
1990: World Equestrian Games, Stockholm. Team Bronze medal with Mon Santa
1991: European Championships, La Baule. Team Silver medal with Mon Santa
1993: European Championships, Gijon. Team Silver medal and individual bronze with Midnight Madness
1994: World Cup Final, 's-Hertogenbosch. 3rd place with Midnight Madness
1995: European Championships, St. Gallen. Silver medals in team and individual with Two Step
1997: European Championships, Mannheim. Team Bronze Medal with Ashley
2001: World Cup Final, Gothenburg. 3rd place with Handel II
2005: World Cup Final, Las Vegas 2nd place with Portofino 63
2007: European Championships, Mannheim. Team Bronze Medal with Portofino 63

References

External links

 BSJA profile
 FEI Rider's Biography
  FEI European Jumping Championship – Mannheim – 2007

1960 births
Living people
English male equestrians
Olympic equestrians of Great Britain
British male equestrians
Olympic silver medallists for Great Britain
Equestrians at the 1984 Summer Olympics
Equestrians at the 1992 Summer Olympics
Equestrians at the 1996 Summer Olympics
Equestrians at the 2000 Summer Olympics
Equestrians at the 2016 Summer Olympics
British show jumping riders
Sportspeople from Huddersfield
Olympic medalists in equestrian
Medalists at the 1984 Summer Olympics